Gholam Ali (also Romanized as Gholām ʿAlī and Gholām‘alī; also known as Gholām) is a village in Dust Mohammad Rural District, in the Central District of Hirmand County, Sistan and Baluchestan Province, Iran. At the 2006 census, its population was 423, in 69 families.

References 

Populated places in Hirmand County